Graham Numa (born 19 August 1954) is a Papuan windsurfer and president of the Papua New Guinea Sailing Association. He competed in the 1988 Summer Olympics and the 1992 Summer Olympics.

References

External links
 
 
 

1954 births
Living people
Papua New Guinean windsurfers
Papua New Guinean male sailors (sport)
Olympic sailors of Papua New Guinea
Sailors at the 1988 Summer Olympics – Division II
Sailors at the 1992 Summer Olympics – Lechner A-390
Papua New Guinean sports coaches
National team coaches